Dimitri Steinmann (born 14 July 1997 in Zurich) is a Swiss professional squash player. As of February 2018, he was ranked number 87 in the world.

References

1997 births
Living people
Swiss male squash players
Sportspeople from Zürich
20th-century Swiss people
21st-century Swiss people
Competitors at the 2022 World Games